Théobald-René, Comte de Kergariou-Locmaria (17 September 1739 – 16 July 1795) was a French Navy officer and Royalist émigré.

Career 
Kergariou-Locmaria was born on 17 September 1739 at Coatilliau Castle, near Lannion, in a family of old nobility. He was brother to Jonathas de Kergariou-Locmaria, to Pierre-Joseph de Kergariou-Rosconnet and to Raymond-Marie de Kergariou-Coatlès.

Early career 
Kergariou-Locmaria joined the Navy in the Gardes de la Marine in 1755, and served on the 50-gun Aigle, under Captain de Saint-Alouarn, in a fleet bound for Saint-Domingue and commanded by Perier.

Promoted to Ensign on 17 April 1757, he was appointed to command the batteries of the coastal defences of Saint-Domingue.

He then served on Orient, on which he took part in the Battle of Quiberon Bay on 20 November 1759. He later served as an officer on the frigates Hébé, from 1760, and Licorne, from 1762. In Licorne, he took part in the raids against British establishments on Newfoundland, under Admiral de Ternay.

After Ternay's expedition, Kergariou-Locmaria returned to the Caribbean, serving on the frigate Comète from 1763, the 80-gun Saint-Esprit from 1764, the fluyt Balance in 1766 and eventually the frigate Belle-Poule from 1769.

In February 1770, Kergariou-Locmaria was promoted to Lieutenant. In 1772, he took part in a campaign in the Indian Ocean on  Belle-Poule, before taking command of the fluyt Esturgeon in 1773. In 1774, he was appointed to command the 14-gun corvette Serin, on which he patrolled and captured several British slave ships. In 1775, Kergariou-Locmaria was appointed Knight of the Order of Saint-Louis.

In 1776, Kergariou served off Île de France as an officer on the 56-gun Brillant. Two years after, he was appointed to command the frigate Oiseau, part of a fleet under Orvilliers. In 1779, he returned on Belle-Poule, this time as her captain.

Service on Junon 
Promoted to Captain on 13 March 1779, Kergariou-Locmaria received command of the frigate Junon, on which he captured the British corvette , on 13 September of that year.

In May 1781, Kergariou transferred to the prestigious first-rate Royal-Louis, on which he served as first officer in Guichen's squadron.

Service on Sibylle  

In June 1781, Kergariou was appointed to command the 32-gun frigate Sibylle. During the action of 18 October 1782, Sibylle supported Scipion, under Grimouard.

Sibylle departed Saint-Domingue, along with the 14-gun corvette Railleur, escorting a 16-ship convoy bound for North America. On 2 January 1783, the convoy was chased by the 44-gun ship of the line HMS Endymion and the 32-gun frigates HMS Emerald and Magicienne. Kergariou-Locmaria signaled the convoy to pursue its route with the Railleur, and endeavoured to cover its retreat, first engaging Magicienne. In the ensuing exchange of fire, Kergariou-Locmaria was severely wounded, but his first officer, Morel d'Escures, took command and managed to dismast Magicienne. Sibylle retreated when the Endymion and Emerald intervened. Thomas Graves, who commanded Magicienne, later commissioned two engravings of the battle, one representing its beginning, and the other its end.

Four days later, a gale entirely dismasted Sibylle; Kergariou-Locmaria was forced to have twelve guns thrown overboard to keep his ship afloat. In distress, Sibylle was spotted by the British corvette, HMS Hussar, under Thomas McNamara Russell, yielding the action of 22 January 1783. Kergariou ordered a British flag hoisted over the French ensign, indicating that Sibylle was a British prize captured from the French, and furthermore had a yachting ensign hoisted upside down as a distress signal; Hussar was not fooled by the ruse, and Kergariou lowered the British flag and fired a broadside at Hussar to prevent her from warning the rest of the British forces of his presence. However, the yachting ensign got stuck and could not be lowered. Hussar fired a single broadside that struck Sibylle under the floating line, inundated her poweder reserves and caused leaks so severe that her pumps could not compensate. Kergariou ordered twelve more guns thrown overboard; when Hussar returned with the 50-gun HMS Centurion, Kergariou's situation became hopeless and he struck his colours after Centurions second broadside.

Controversy later ensued when Russell accused Kergariou of firing a broadside while flying British colours and distress signals. After receiving Kergariou's sword, Russell broke it publicly, accusing him of bad faith and violation of the laws of war; Kergariou and his officers were kept under guard in the orlop, fed basic food rations, and were not given bedding to sleep. Later, Admiral Digby received Kergariou with courtesy. In the automatic court-martial for the loss of his ship, the allegations were brought to the attention of the court; Kergariou-Locmaria was honourably discharged of all accusations of wrongdoing.

On 16 August 1784, Kergariou-Locmaria was admitted to the Society of the Cincinnati. At the end of the American War of Independence, he totalled nine campaigns in America, three journeys in the Indian Ocean, had fought in three battles and had been severely wounded.

French Revolution and the Battle of Quiberon 
In 1786, Kergariou was given command of the frigate Calypso, leading a three-year expedition in the Indian Ocean.

At the beginning of the French Revolution, Kergariou-Locmaria emigrated.

He later took part in the British-sponsored Invasion of France in 1795, where he was captured by Republican forces under General Hoche. Tried by the Revolutionaries, he was sentenced to death. Geoffroy d'Antrechaux later reported that Kergariou thus addressed his troops:

Kergariou is also reported to have recited a memorial office to his fellow prisoners before being shot.
Amongst the others executed that day was his brother Kergariou-Rosconnet.

Notes, citations, and references 
Notes

Citations

References
 
 
 
 
 
 
 

1739 births
1795 deaths
French Navy officers